DJ of the Month is the seventh studio album by Bob Ostertag, released on November 19, 2002 by Seeland Records.

Reception
The Squid's Ear gave the DJ of the Month a positive review and said "the listener is assailed by sounds from all angles that rapidly collide and slam the ears" and "music is fragmented, sped and slowed, compressed and expanded and mangled in all possible descriptions."

Track listing

Personnel
Adapted from the DJ of the Month liner notes.

Musicians
 Bob Ostertag – sampler

Release history

References

External links 
 DJ of the Month at Bandcamp
 DJ of the Month at Discogs (list of releases)

2002 albums
Bob Ostertag albums
Seeland Records albums
Sound collage albums